Dangerous Love is a 1920 American silent Western film based on the 1917 novel Ben Warman by Charles E. Winter, who would later become a congressman for Wyoming. The film was directed by Charles Bartlett, and stars Pete Morrison, Carol Holloway, Ruth King, Jack Richardson, and Spottiswoode Aitken. The movie was shot at the Lakeside Studios in Denver, Colorado. The feature had previously been announced under several titles before its release, including The Vanishing Strain, Ben Warman, A Good Bad Man, and Broken Promises.

Synopsis
Ben Warman, a likable boy with a proclivity for gambling and fighting, alienates the owner of a saloon in a Western mining town by helping a girl remove her drunken father from the premises. In so doing he makes a friend of the Woman, a young school teacher who makes Ben promise to give up his vices. Their romance is endangered, however, by the arrival of an Eastern girl, who takes a fancy to Ben, and her brother, who falls for the schoolteacher. The Easterners see that the teacher gets false reports of the cause of Ben's fights, and the schoolteacher leaves for the East to study music. The saloon owner, enlisting the aid of an adventuress, hatches a plan to defraud Ben of a mine claim, but the school teacher returns in time to foil the scheme and be reunited with Ben.

Cast
 Pete Morrison as Ben Warman 
 Carol Holloway as The Woman 
 Ruth King as The Other Woman 
 Spottiswoode Aitken as The Father 
 Harry von Meter as Gerald Lorimer 
 William Lion West as Cafe Owner  
 Jack Richardson as Half-Breed 
 Verne Layton as The Editor 
 William Welsh    
 Zelma Edwards

References

External links

 
 

1920 films
1920 Western (genre) films
Films based on American novels
Films directed by Charles Bartlett
American black-and-white films
Films shot in Colorado
Silent American Western (genre) films
Films based on Western (genre) novels
1920s American films